Geminella is a genus of green algae in the phylum Chlorophyta.

Species
 Geminella interrupta
 Geminella minor
 Geminella mutabilis
 Geminella terricola
 Geminella sp. SAG 20.84
 Geminella sp. SAG 54.81

References

Trebouxiophyceae genera
Chlorellaceae